The Salmo station (located in Salmo, British Columbia, Canada) was built by the Great Northern Railway (U.S.) that later become the  Burlington Northern Railroad  along the Nelson and Fort Sheppard Railway, a branch line extending north into Canada.  The 1-story, wood-frame, railway station was completed in 1913 and consists of a waiting room,  ticket office and the freight and baggage room.  The station was built as part of a move by the Northern Railway to gain customers from the dominant railway in the region, the  Canadian Pacific Railway.

The building was designated a historic railway station in 1992.

References 

Designated Heritage Railway Stations in British Columbia
Former Great Northern Railway (U.S.) stations
Railway stations in Canada opened in 1913
Disused railway stations in Canada
Railway stations in British Columbia
1913 establishments in British Columbia